Salina Bookshelf is a publishing company based in Flagstaff, Arizona.

Founded in 1994 by teenagers Eric and Kenneth Lockard, non-native but fluent in the Navajo language due to growing up among the Navajo, the company specializes in Navajo-language books, mostly for children and teenagers, and is the only Navajo-language publisher in the United States. 

Among its publications are a bilingual edition of the children's book Who wants to be a prairie dog? in English and Navajo, and Diné Bizaad Bínáhooʼaah, a Navajo language textbook that was officially adopted by the state of New Mexico in 2008. 

Salina Bookshelf currently has six full-time employees and three translators.

References

Book publishing companies of the United States
Navajo language
Flagstaff, Arizona
1994 establishments in Arizona